The following is a list of native wild mammal species recorded in Antarctica. There are 23 mammal species in Antarctica, all of which are marine. Three are considered endangered, one is vulnerable, eight are listed as data deficient, and one has not yet been evaluated. Domesticated species, such as the dogs formerly present, are not included.

The following tags are used to highlight each species' conservation status as assessed by the International Union for Conservation of Nature; those on the left are used here, those in the second column in some other articles:

Order: Carnivora (carnivorans) 

There are over 260 species of carnivorans, the majority of which feed primarily on meat. They have a characteristic skull shape and dentition. The southern elephant seal is believed to be the largest carnivoran of all time; bulls typically weigh . The lobodontine seals comprise about 80% of the global biomass of pinnipeds, a reflection of the high productivity of the Southern Ocean; all have circumpolar distributions surrounding Antarctica and breed on pack ice or shore-fast ice. Antarctic fur seals and southern elephant seals, in contrast, while doing much of their feeding at the edge of the continent, breed on subantarctic islands, such as South Georgia. Warmblooded prey makes up a significant proportion of the leopard seal's diet, and is occasionally taken by Antarctic fur seals.

Suborder: Caniformia
Clade Pinnipedia (seals, sea lions and walruses)
Family: Otariidae (eared seals)
Genus: Arctocephalus
 Antarctic fur seal, A. gazella 
Family: Phocidae (earless seals)
Genus: Mirounga
 Southern elephant seal, M. leonina 
Tribe Lobodontini (Antarctic seals)
Genus: Hydrurga
 Leopard seal, Hydrurga leptonyx 
Genus: Leptonychotes 
 Weddell seal, Leptonychotes weddellii 
Genus: Lobodon
 Crabeater seal, Lobodon carcinophaga 
Genus: Ommatophoca
 Ross seal, Ommatophoca rossii

Order: Cetacea (whales, dolphins and porpoises) 

The infraorder Cetacea includes whales, dolphins and porpoises. They are the mammals most fully adapted to aquatic life with a spindle-shaped nearly hairless body, protected by a thick layer of blubber, and forelimbs and tail modified to provide propulsion underwater. Their closest extant relatives are the hippos, which are artiodactyls, from which cetaceans descended; cetaceans are thus also artiodactyls.

The hunting of baleen whales in the vicinity of Antarctica began around 1904, with the establishment of a whaling station on South Georgia. Hunting of blue whales was banned in 1966, and finally brought under control in the 1970s. By that time the blue whale population had been reduced to 0.15% of its original size. Whaling for other species in the Southern Hemisphere was banned in 1976. Numbers have recovered somewhat since, but the largest species remain endangered.

Parvorder: Mysticeti
Family: Balaenidae
Genus: Eubalaena
 Southern right whale, E. australis 
Family: Neobalaenidae
Genus: Caperea
 Pygmy right whale, C. marginata 
Family: Balaenopteridae
Subfamily: Balaenopterinae
Genus: Balaenoptera
 Common minke whale, Balaenoptera acutorostrata 
 Antarctic minke whale, Balaenoptera bonaerensis 
 Sei whale, Balaenoptera borealis 
 Southern sei whale, B. b. schlegelii
 Blue whale, Balaenoptera musculus 
 Southern blue whale, B. m. intermedia 
 Fin whale, Balaenoptera physalus 
 Southern fin whale, B. p. quoyi
Subfamily: Megapterinae
Genus: Megaptera
 Humpback whale, Megaptera novaeangliae 
Parvorder: Odontoceti
Family: Physeteridae
Genus: Physeter
 Sperm whale, Physeter macrocephalus 
Family: Ziphidae
Genus: Berardius
 Arnoux's beaked whale, Berardius arnuxii 
Genus: Mesoplodon
 Gray's beaked whale, Mesoplodon grayi 
Genus: Hyperoodon
 Southern bottlenose whale, Hyperoodon planifrons 
Superfamily: Delphinoidea
Family: Phocoenidae
Genus: Phocoena
 Spectacled porpoise, Phocoena dioptrica 
Family: Delphinidae (marine dolphins)
Genus: Cephalorhynchus
 Commerson's dolphin, Cephalorhynchus commersonii 
Genus: Globicephala
 Long-finned pilot whale, Globicephala melas 
Genus: Lagenorhynchus
 Hourglass dolphin, Lagenorhynchus cruciger 
Genus: Orcinus
 Orca, Orcinus orca

See also
List of chordate orders
List of mammals of South America
Lists of mammals by region
List of prehistoric mammals
Mammal classification
List of mammals described in the 2000s

Notes

References
 

Mammals
Mammals
Antarctica
Mammals